Raghu Karumanchi is an Indian actor who appears in Telugu films in comic and supporting roles. He acted in more than 150 films. He also appeared in several television shows, including Jabardasth.

Life 
He was born and brought up in Hyderabad. His family hails from Tenali, Andhra Pradesh. His father is a retired army officer and his mother is a housewife. He completed his MBA and worked as a software engineer. He is married and has two children.

Career 

He made his debut as an actor with the film Aadi starring Jr. NTR. He got break as an actor with the film Adhurs. He also led a team called Roller Raghu in the popular TV comedy show Jabardasth on ETV.

He appeared in 1500 TV episodes in 32 titles on various channels. He received an award from Prasar Bharati and UNICEF for producing the best short film on saving the girl child in 2006.

Filmography

References

External links
 

Telugu male actors
Telugu comedians
Living people
Indian male comedians
Male actors from Hyderabad, India
Year of birth missing (living people)